Breim is a former municipality in the old Sogn og Fjordane county, Norway. It is part of the traditional district of Nordfjord in the eastern part of the present-day Gloppen Municipality which is now in Vestland county. The  municipality existed from 1886 until 1964. The administrative center was the village of Reed (sometimes called Re).

Breim municipality was located to the east of Gloppen, south of Stryn and the Utvik mountains, west of the Jostedalsbreen glacier, and north of Jølster.  The municipality was centered on the lake Breimsvatn. Many of the inhabitants lived on the shores of the lake or in the large river valley extending east from the lake. The main church for the municipality was Breim Church, located in Reed.

Name
The area's original name comes from the Old Norse word . The first element of that name comes from the Old Norse word Breiðr which means "broad" and the last element is efni which means "condition". Throughout the centuries, the name changed through misunderstandings and corruptions, and it changed to Breiheim or Breidem, where the second element of the name became like the old word -heimr meaning "home". The current spelling of the name was settled upon by the 1800s.

History
On 1 January 1886, Gloppen Municipality was split into two municipalities: Gloppen (population: 2,970) and Breim (population: 1,823). During the 1960s, there were many municipal mergers across Norway due to the work of the Schei Committee. On 1 January 1964, the small Førde farm (population: 38) at the southern end of the lake Breimsvatnet was administratively transferred to Jølster Municipality to the south. On the same date, the rest of Breim (population: 1,731) was merged (back) into Gloppen Municipality.

Schools
The area of Breim is divided into two school districts: Byrkjelo, with the Byrkjelo school and Reed with the Reed school. Both schools are primary schools. After 8th grade students have to travel to the Gloppen ungdomskule (secondary school) in Sandane.

Government

Municipal council
The municipal council  of Breim was made up of 17 representatives that were elected to four-year terms. The party breakdown of the final municipal council was as follows:

See also
List of former municipalities of Norway

References

External links

Weather information for Breim 

Gloppen
Former municipalities of Norway
1886 establishments in Norway
1964 disestablishments in Norway